Tamerlane Lincoln Kennedy (born Tamerlane Fizel Kennedy Jr.; February 12, 1971) is a former football offensive tackle. He played college football at Washington, and was recognized as a consensus All-American.

A first-round selection in the 1993 NFL Draft, Kennedy played eleven seasons in the National Football League (NFL) for the Atlanta Falcons and Oakland Raiders, then three years for the Tampa Bay Storm of the Arena Football League (AFL). He is currently a broadcaster for the Las Vegas Raiders and Premiere Radio Networks.

Early years
Born in York, Pennsylvania, Kennedy grew up in the southeast part of San Diego, California. His birth name was Tamerlane Fizel Kennedy Jr., but his mother called him "Little Lincoln", referring to their shared birthday (February 12). The nickname stuck, and Lincoln had it legally changed after college. He graduated from San Diego's Samuel F. B. Morse High School in 1988, where he played football for the Morse Tigers.

College career
Kennedy attended the University of Washington in Seattle, where he played for the Huskies under head coach Don James. After redshirting as a true freshman in 1988, he was switched from defense to offense. In 1991 and 1992, he was the recipient of the Morris Trophy, awarded annually to the outstanding offensive lineman in the Pacific-10 Conference. As a senior, he was a consensus first-team All-American in 1992, and started in his  third consecutive Rose Bowl; a year earlier, the Huskies went undefeated and shared the national championship (with Miami). 

Kennedy was inducted into the College Football Hall of Fame in 2015.

Professional career

National Football League
Kennedy was the ninth overall pick in the 1993 NFL Draft, taken by the Atlanta Falcons. He started at left guard throughout his rookie season in 1993, but lost the job the following year to veteran free agent Dave Richards, out of UCLA. After a disappointing 1995 season, Kennedy was traded to the Oakland Raiders in exchange for a fifth-round pick in the 1997 NFL Draft, where he started at right tackle in all but three games of his first seven seasons there. In November 1999, during a Monday night game against the Denver Broncos at Mile High Stadium, Kennedy went after a fan who hit him in the face with a snowball. As a member of the Raiders, Kennedy was named to three consecutive Pro Bowls and anchored the offensive line in Super Bowl XXXVII.

After leaving the field in 2004, Kennedy's degree in speech communications prepared him to accept a position with the NFL Network as one of the hosts of NFL Total Access.

In 2005, his attempted comeback with the Dallas Cowboys failed, due to his inability to pass the team physical.

Arena Football League
In 2007, 2008, and 2010, he played for the Tampa Bay Storm in the Arena Football League.

Broadcasting
Kennedy currently works for Fox Sports Radio as show co-host. He is also a co-host on Las Vegas radio station Raider Nation Radio 920 AM. He has called Pac-12 college football games as the color analyst and as a track reporter during NASCAR races. In 2013, he joined the Oakland Raiders radio broadcast team at Compass Media Networks; he was promoted to color commentator in 2018, partnered with play-by-play announcer Brent Musburger.
On Saturday morning, April 17th, 2021 Kennedy announced that he would go on hiatus from his Fox Sports Radio assignment.

Other appearances
Kennedy made an appearance on Arliss in 2000 (Episode: 504: "Comings and Goings"), and appeared in Two and a Half Men in 2005, ("Principal Gallagher's Lesbian Lover"). He appears as himself in the 2006 film The Marine.

Personal life
His son, Zach Banner, was born in December 1993, and is an offensive tackle. While Banner is his biological son, he was raised by Ron Banner, who married his son's mother and legally adopted him. Banner had no idea who Lincoln Kennedy was, or that he was his real father, until he was in seventh grade.

Once, not long after the death of John F. Kennedy Jr., Kennedy made the remark on ESPN's SportsCenter that, "My name's Lincoln Kennedy, I ain't got a chance," in reference to the assassination of Presidents Abraham Lincoln and John F. Kennedy.

Kennedy held the all-time record on the "Wall of Fame" at Seattle eatery Shultzy's Sausage before the restaurant changed locations and did away with the Wall. In his record-setting effort, he consumed 11 of the restaurant's signature link sausages on French rolls and a large Coca-Cola within one hour.

See also
 List of Arena Football League and National Football League players

References

External links
 Profile at ArenaFan

1971 births
Living people
All-American college football players
American Conference Pro Bowl players
American football offensive tackles
Atlanta Falcons players
College football announcers
National Football League announcers
Las Vegas Raiders announcers
Oakland Raiders announcers
Oakland Raiders players
Players of American football from Pennsylvania
Players of American football from San Diego
Sportspeople from York, Pennsylvania
Tampa Bay Storm players
Washington Huskies football players